Andrzej Sikorski (born 4 September 1961) is a Polish former cyclist. He competed in the team pursuit event at the 1988 Summer Olympics.

References

External links
 

1961 births
Living people
Polish male cyclists
Olympic cyclists of Poland
Cyclists at the 1988 Summer Olympics
Sportspeople from Szczecin